The Hartvig Nissen School, informally referred to as Nissen, is a gymnasium in Oslo, Norway. It is located in the neighborhood Uranienborg in the affluent West End borough of Frogner. It is Norway's oldest high school for girls and is widely considered one of the country's two most prestigious high schools alongside the traditionally male-only Oslo Cathedral School; its alumni include many  famous individuals and two members of the Norwegian royal family.

Originally named Nissen's Girls' School, it was founded by Hartvig Nissen and was originally a private girls' school which was owned by its headmasters and which served the higher bourgeoisie. The school formerly also had its own teachers college. The school and its teachers college have the distinction of being both the first gymnasium and the first higher education institution in Norway which admitted females, and the school and its owners played a key role in promoting female education during the 19th and early 20th century.

The school was located at the address Rosenkrantz' Gade 7 from 1849 to 1860 and at the address Øvere Voldgade 15 from 1860 to 1899. Then-owner-headmaster Bernhard Pauss moved the school to its current address, Niels Juels gate 56, and commissioned the construction of the current school building which was completed in 1899. In 1991 the school also acquired the building of its former neighbours Frogner School and Haagaas School at Niels Juels gate 52.

The TV series Skam was centered on the school.

History

It was established in 1849 by Hartvig Nissen and was originally a private girls' school, named Nissen's Girls' School (Nissens Pigeskole, later changed to the modern spelling Nissens Pikeskole). The school was privately owned, usually by its headmasters, until it was sold to Christiania Municipality in 1918. Nissen's Girls' School was the first institution in Norway to offer examen artium—the university entrance exam—for women. Then-owner Bernhard Cathrinus Pauss also established the first tertiary education for women in Norway, a women's teacher's college named Nissen's Teachers' College (Nissens Lærerinneskole).

Nissen's Girls' School mainly served the higher bourgeoisie, and was one of three leading private higher schools in Oslo, alongside Frogner School and Vestheim School. Due to its location in the wealthy borough of Frogner and also because few working-class Norwegians attended gymnasium before the "education revolution" that started in the 1960s, it remained a school of choice for pupils from affluent families also after it was acquired by the municipality, although today, it has pupils from all parts of Oslo and with more diverse backgrounds. Its alumni include two members of the Norwegian Royal Family, Princess Ragnhild and Princess Astrid.

From 1860 to 1899, the school was located in a building in Øvre Vollgate 15 in central Oslo. The current school building in Niels Juels gate 56 was commissioned by then-owner Bernhard Cathrinus Pauss in 1897, designed by Hartvig Nissen's son, architect Henrik Nissen, and built by Harald Kaas. The school was opened for boys in 1955 and it changed its name to the current one in 1963. In 1970, it also acquired the buildings of its neighbour, the former Frogner School. The school is famous for its focus on theatre, having many actors among its alumni. It was also the first school in Norway to introduce a pupil's council, in 1919.

The school was also shown in the TV series Skam. The show is about teen Norwegian girls and boys who live in Oslo and go to ‘Hartvig Nisse Skole’

Owners

Hartvig Nissen (1849–1872, sole owner until 1865, then one third)
Johan Carl Keyser (1865–1899, one third)
Einar Lyche (1865–1899, one third)
Andreas Martin Corneliussen (1899–1900, one half)
Bernhard Cathrinus Pauss (1872–1903, one third until 1899, one half until 1900 and sole owner 1900–1903)
Frogner skoles interessentskap (Thorvald Prebensen, Theodor Haagaas and others) (1903–1918, sole owner)
Christiania/Oslo municipality (sole owner from 1918)

Notable faculty 
Notable people who have taught at Nissen's Girls' School/Hartvig Nissen School include:

 Peter Ludwig Mejdell Sylow, mathematician who proved foundational results in group theory.
Ole Jacob Broch, mathematician, physicist, economist and government minister.

Notable alumni 

Notable people who have graduated from Nissen's Girls' School/Hartvig Nissen School include:

Princess Ragnhild
Princess Astrid
Eva Nansen, mezzosoprano and wife of Fridtjof Nansen
Margrethe Munthe, children's writer, songwriter and playwright
Clara Holst, first woman to obtain a doctorate in Norway
Margrethe Parm, Christian leader and scout leader 
Ragnhild Jølsen, writer
Harriet Backer, painter
Alette Engelhart, women's activist
Lillebjørn Nilsen, songwriter
Toril Brekke, novelist
Ragna Nielsen, pedagogue
Triana Iglesias, model
Tarjei Sandvik Moe, actor
Hege Schøyen, comedian
Jon Balke, jazz musician
Maria Bonnevie, actress
Ulrik Imtiaz Rolfsen, film director
Lea Myren, actress and fashion model

References

External links
Official website

Further reading
Nissens Pigeskole og Privatseminar, Nissens Pigeskole, Christiania, 1900
 Einar Boyesen (ed.): Nissens pikeskole 1849–1924, Oslo 1924
 Nils A. Ytreberg: Nissen pikeskole 1849–1949, Oslo 1949
 Maja Lise Rønneberg: Hartvig Nissens skole 150 år: 1849–1999, Oslo 1999

1849 establishments in Norway
Educational institutions established in 1849
Schools in Oslo
Secondary schools in Norway